Neurensin-2 is a protein that in humans is encoded by the NRSN2 gene.

References

Further reading